Mohd. Salim Uddin Tarafder (born 1 October 1968) is a Bangladesh Awami League politician and the incumbent Jatiya Sangsad member from the Naogaon-3 constituency.

Career
Tarafder was elected to Parliament from Naogaon-3 on 5 January 2014 as a Bangladesh Awami League candidate.

References

Living people
1968 births
Awami League politicians
10th Jatiya Sangsad members
11th Jatiya Sangsad members
Place of birth missing (living people)
People from Naogaon District